Ishizaka (written:  lit. "stone hill") is a Japanese surname. Notable people with the surname include:

Danjulo Ishizaka, German-Japanese cellist, brother of Kimiko Douglass-Ishizaka
, Japanese music industry executive
, Japanese scientist
, Japanese actor
, Japanese artistic gymnast
, Japanese businessman
, Japanese scientist
, Japanese politician
, Japanese writer
, Japanese beach volleyball player

See also
Kimiko Douglass-Ishizaka (born 1976), German-Japanese classical pianist, weightlifter and powerlifter

Japanese-language surnames